Wayside crosses in Romania are a cultural and religious phenomenon.

Terminology and description

The crosses are a feature of the village landscape, where they were built for divine protection in places thought dangerous. They were meant to preserve the natural order; merely looking at one would confirm the presence of God. The cross is usually made of hardwood, painted on one or both sides. More rarely, they are carved with solar motifs. Some are made of stone or metal. With time and technological advance, simple designs gave way to complex elements.

Symbolic considerations
The crosses recall a pre-Christian time when people would set up ritual columns or altars in places where the cosmic peace was disturbed by evil spirits, hoping to restore order. Crossroads have also been attracted mystical powers since antiquity; their mythological significance acquired a religious one with the adoption of Christianity, given their cross shape. Columns and poles gave way to crosses, so that the  represents “an ad hoc synthesis between the ancient and Christian strata”.

He defines a sanctuary as a place proclaimed holy and respected as such by the people, out of magical, mythical or religious motives. These objects are found in the village center, at the village entrance and exit, at crossroads, unclean places, hillocks and, generally speaking, where the physical and spiritual worlds merge.

Often, the crosses are surrounded by a shelter, with a door towards the road and windows at the sides. Travelers hit by rainstorms can wait inside. In the past, where the water source was farther away, villagers would leave a pitcher of fresh water for passersby. Shelters are rarer in hay and mountain areas; the crosses there are usually covered by tile roofs. The shelters, which form a sort of chapel, are usually painted on the exterior and interior. Christ Pantocrator or the Trinity is on the ceiling, flanked by the Four Evangelists, angels or prophets. Saints and angels are found lower down, with empty spaces filled by grape leaves, ears of wheat, floral or geometric patterns. The exterior might feature medallions of saints or Biblical scenes. Inscriptions appear painted on the inside or carved into the cross.

The magic associations of water means that crosses are found near streams, bridges and wells, superstition holding that well bottoms can hold evil forces. The , pointing heavenward, guards against the dark forces in the depths of the earth. Crosses at village entrances served to guard the locals from plagues and enemies, and were also landmarks. Homeowners would raise crosses in front of their dwellings, seeking spiritual protection. Cemetery  do not commemorate the dead, instead watching the boundary between living and dead, amplifying the power of the cross symbol. Finally, a  can be a cenotaph, celebrating war heroes whose bodies have not been found, or other dead buried elsewhere.

World War I crosses

A particular type of troiță proliferated in interwar Greater Romania: that dedicated to the fallen soldiers of World War I, and promoted by the Cultul Eroilor memorial society. With the majority of soldiers coming from rural areas, it was considered an appropriate way to commemorate the peasant-soldier hero. In 1921, Gala Galaction wrote of the crosses’ aptness for marking scattered graves “which will never be able to be gathered together”. Another writer likened them to “beings kneeling in prayer”, protecting “this sacred land hallowed by the most precious Romanian blood and bodies”.

The designers sought to integrate the crosses into their surroundings, as was the case with the ones set up in the military cemeteries near Curtea de Argeș Monastery and in Sinaia. By 1931, a number had been erected in small, new military cemeteries. Additionally, as noted in a 1926 article, troițe were placed on the battlefields where troops had died. At times, proposed crosses drew objections from local authorities. For example, at Odorhei in 1934, local politicians argued that placing a donated troiță in the city center would damage its aesthetics; it was instead relegated to the yard of the Gendarmerie school.

A number of troițe were dedicated to historical figures during the period. In 1925, one recalling Michael the Brave was unveiled on the site of the Battle of Șelimbăr near Sibiu; a lavish ceremony was organized by ASTRA and led by Nicolae Bălan. From the following year, another cross marked his grave at Turda. Others so honored include Tudor Vladimirescu (Bucharest), Ilie Măcelar (Sibiu) and Aurel Vlaicu (Bănești, Prahova, near the site of his airplane crash). In 1934, Cultul Eroilor donated a concrete cross to Cercetașii României, unveiled during their jamboree at Mamaia in the presence of King Carol II. Throughout the 1920s and ‘30s, the society sent oak and concrete crosses to places around Romania, making efforts to include communities that struggled financially. Thus, alongside the standard monument, the troiță became an accepted way to honor the war dead.

Historiography
The  has been a subject of academic study since the early 20th century. Tudor Pamfile included drawings of the crosses in a 1910 work. Nicolae Iorga considered them as "cheap establishments of believers who lacked the means to show their faith by raising churches"; he added, "at their origins, they were, I believe, something else". They also preoccupied Alexandru Tzigara-Samurcaș (1909, 1928), Tache Papahagi, and particularly George Oprescu, who called them "curious and impressive expressions of faith" that also satisfied "the remaining pagan superstition" left in the collective consciousness.

It was Vulcănescu who undertook the most thorough research into the phenomenon. His 1947 study  remains a standard reference. In 2003, Ionel Oprișan published . There, he proposed a classification drawing on Vulcănescu: sacred pre-Christian monuments (heavenly columns and poles), sacred Christian monuments (cross-shaped, icon-bearing and boundary . Further research continued into the 21st century, with a particular focus on Mărginimea Sibiului.

List
The following wayside crosses are listed as historic monuments by Romania's Ministry of Culture and Religious Affairs. Nearly all are associated with the Romanian Orthodox faith.

Notes

References

 Adrian Stoia, “Troițele din Mărginimea Sibiului, cu o privire specială asupra crucii din piatră de la Boița”, in Studia Universitatis Cibiniensis. Series Historica, vol. XIV/2017, pp. 45-61
 Radu Totoianu, Călin Anghel, Troițe și cimitire cu stâlpi funerari de pe Valea și din Munții Sebeșului. Cluj-Napoca: Editura Mega, 2018, 
 Valeria Soroștineanu, “Despre troițe și Cultul Eroilor”, in Astra Sabesiensis, vol. 6/2020, pp. 161-72

Romanian mythology
Wayside crosses
Romanian Orthodox Church
Monuments and memorials in Romania